The Awhum Waterfall is located at Amaugwe village of Awhum town in Udi Local Government Area, Enugu State, Nigeria. The Awhum Waterfall is formed out of a massive outcrop of granite rock with water flow at the top forming a stream. Some part of the waterfall is usually warm through the seasons. The Awhum waterfall is 30 metres high and is located around the Awhum Monastery.

The locals believe the water has healing powers and is capable of driving away evil spirits if used.

The Awhum Waterfall is also a popular tourist location in Nigeria.

Gallery

See also 
 Agbokim Waterfalls
 Erin-Ijesha Waterfalls
 List of waterfalls

References 

Enugu State
Waterfalls of Nigeria
Tourist attractions in Nigeria